Jessica Prunell (born April 25, 1977) is an American lawyer and formerly a child actress.

Prunell is the daughter of Tito and Kay Prunell. She graduated from the University of Pennsylvania with a B.A. in Psychology in 1999. She continued her education at Benjamin N. Cardozo School of Law. She was admitted into the New York State Bar in 2003 and she has been a member ever since.

Prunell began modeling and making commercials when she was 6 years old, eventually obtaining a contract with the Ford Model Agency. Photographs of her were used in print advertising and on toy boxes, and she expanded her work to include making commercials for AT&T and Life cereal, among other companies and products. Her first feature film was Born on the Fourth of July. On television, Prunell portrayed Winifred Tattinger on the NBC comedy Tattingers (1989).

Since her graduation from law school, she has been practicing general commercial litigation. She has been an associate of the Fischer & Mandell law firm in New York City.  She currently is an attorney with Hogan, Lovells LLP in New York City.

Filmography

References

External links 

 

1977 births
Living people
20th-century American actresses
American child actresses
American film actresses
American television actresses
American women lawyers
University of Pennsylvania alumni
People associated with Hogan Lovells
21st-century American women